Loma Records was an American subsidiary record label of Warner Bros. Records managed by Bob Krasnow, then later Russ Regan. Its name was derived from Eloma, a cleared copyright Warner owned.

History
In March 1964, Warner Bros. president Mike Maitland announced the formation of Loma Records. Former promotional man and record producer Bob Krasnow was named the manager of the new label. Maitland explained the purpose of Loma was "an attempt to broaden singles coverage. There's so much product available through outside source, that we can afford to release it on Warner Bros., Reprise and now Loma." The first releases on the label were purchased masters.

R&B duo Ike & Tina Turner were one of the first signings to the label. Their single "Tell Her I'm Not Home" reached the Top 40 on the R&B charts in 1965. Most of the releases on Loma didn't make a big impact on the charts, but in 1967 Linda Jones had two Top 10 R&B hits. Other artists on the roster included the Olympics, J.J. Jackson, Lorraine Ellison, Mighty Hannibal, and Redd Foxx. Most artists on the label didn't make it to LP status until the release of a two-CD set in 1995 called The Best of Loma Records.

Krasnow resigned as the manager of Loma in 1965 and was replaced by Russ Regan. In 1968, Loma's roster and back catalog were absorbed into Warner Bros. In 1995, a compilation of its singles called The Best of Loma Records: The Rise and Fall of a 1960's Soul Label was released.

In 2002, Loma was briefly reactivated for the release of the self-titled CD of the jazz trio Yaya3, which featured drummer Brian Blade, saxophonist Joshua Redman, and keyboardist Sam Yahel.

Roster

 The Olympics
 J.J. Jackson
 Lorraine Ellison
 Ike & Tina Turner
The Mighty Hannibal
Linda Jones
 Redd Foxx
Bobby Freeman
Lonnie Youngblood
Bobby Bennett and The Dynamics
Kell Osbourne
Bob & Earl
Roy Redmond
The Realistics
The Apollas
Ben Aiken
The Enchanters
 Baby Lloyd

Selected discography

Albums 

 1966: The Both Sides Of Redd Foxx
 1967: The Ike & Tina Turner Show — Vol. 2
 1967: Redd Foxx — On The Loose: Recorded Live!
 1967: Redd Foxx —"Live" Las Vegas!
 1968: Redd Foxx — Foxx-A-Delic

Singles

References

External links

Record labels disestablished in 1968
Record labels established in 1964
Warner Records